Rio Grande National Forest is a 1.86 million-acre (7,530 km²)  U.S. National Forest located in southwestern Colorado. The forest encompasses the San Luis Valley, which is the world's largest agricultural alpine valley, as well as one of the world's largest high deserts located around mountains.  The Rio Grande rises in the forest, and the Continental Divide runs along most of its western border. The forest lies in parts of nine counties. In descending order of land area within the forest they are Saguache, Mineral, Conejos, Rio Grande, Hinsdale, San Juan, Alamosa, Archuleta, and Custer counties. Forest headquarters are currently located in Monte Vista, Colorado, but plan to move to Del Norte. There are local ranger district offices in Del Norte, La Jara, and Saguache.

Wilderness areas

There are four officially designated wilderness areas lying within Rio Grande National Forest that are part of the National Wilderness Preservation System. All of them extend partially into neighboring National Forests, and one of these also onto National Park Service land (as indicated).
 La Garita Wilderness (mostly in Gunnison NF)
 Sangre de Cristo Wilderness (the largest part in San Isabel NF; also partly in Great Sand Dunes National Park and Preserve)
 South San Juan Wilderness (partly in San Juan NF)
 Weminuche Wilderness (mostly in San Juan NF)

Climate

According to the Köppen Climate Classification system, Rio Grande Reservoir has a warm-summer humid continental climate, abbreviated "Dfb" on climate maps.

See also
List of largest National Forests
List of U.S. National Forests

References

External links

Rio Grande National Forest (United States Forest Service)

 
National Forests of Colorado
National Forests of the Rocky Mountains
Protected areas of Mineral County, Colorado
Protected areas of Conejos County, Colorado
Protected areas of Rio Grande County, Colorado
Protected areas of Hinsdale County, Colorado
Protected areas of San Juan County, Colorado
Protected areas of Alamosa County, Colorado
Protected areas of Saguache County, Colorado
Protected areas of Archuleta County, Colorado
Protected areas of Custer County, Colorado
Protected areas established in 1908
1908 establishments in Colorado